In mathematical physics, the Wu–Sprung potential, named after Hua Wu and Donald Sprung, is a potential function in one dimension inside a Hamiltonian  with the potential defined by solving a non-linear integral equation defined by the Bohr–Sommerfeld quantization conditions involving the spectral staircase, the energies  and the potential .

For the case of the Riemann zeros Wu and Sprung and others have shown that the potential can be written implicitly in terms of the Gamma function and zeroth-order Bessel function.

and that the density of states of this Hamiltonian is just the Delsarte's formula for the Riemann zeta function and defined semiclassically as 

here they have taken the derivative of the Euler product on the critical line ; also they use the Dirichlet generating function .  is the Mangoldt function.

The main idea by Wu and Sprung and others is to interpret the density of states as the distributional Delsarte's formula and then use the WKB method to evaluate the imaginary part of the zeros by using quantum mechanics.

Wu and Sprung also showed that the zeta-regularized functional determinant is the Riemann Xi-function 

The main idea inside this problem is to recover the potential from spectral data as in some inverse spectral problems in this case the spectral data is the Eigenvalue staircase, which is a quantum property of the system, the inverse of the potential then, satisfies an Abel integral equation (fractional calculus) which can be immediately solved to obtain the potential.

Asymptotics

This potential is approximately a Morse potential with 

References 

 
 G. Sierra, A physics pathway to the Riemann hypothesis, arXiv:math-ph/1012.4264, 2010.
 
 Rev. Mod. Phys. 2011; 83, 307–330 Colloquium: Physics of the Riemann hypothesis
 Trace formula in noncommutative geometry and the zeros of the Riemann zeta function Alain Connes 
 
 
 
 
 Some remarks on the Wu–Sprung potential. Preliminary report Diego Dominici 
 http://empslocal.ex.ac.uk/people/staff/mrwatkin/zeta/NTfractality.htm

Mathematical physics